Amphimyces is a fungal genus  in the family Laboulbeniaceae. This is a monotypic genus, containing the single species Amphimyces cerylonis.

See also
List of Laboulbeniaceae genera

References

Laboulbeniomycetes
Monotypic Laboulbeniales genera